Murray Kidd (born 1953 in Te Kuiti) is a New Zealand former rugby union representative player and coach.

Playing career

Kidd first came to prominence as a 17-year-old, being picked to play for Taranaki against the 1971 British Lions in their 9-14 loss, while still at New Plymouth Boys High School. He acquitted himself well against the likes of David Duckham.

He later played for Manawatu (University, 1973) and King Country (Piopio, 1974-84). In 1977 he played for King Country-Wanganui in their 9-60 loss against the British Lions. He also played for the New Zealand Zealand Universities in 1973 and had All Black trials in 1978 (replacing Bruce Robertson after 66 minutes), 1979 and 1981.

His first class career included 142 games and 58 tries.

Coaching career
Kidd worked as a coach in Ireland, at Garryowen Football Club, in 1991/92, and at Sunday's Well, in Division Two of the AIB League.

He coached King Country in 1994, when they were placed 8th out of 9 teams in the First Division of the Air New Zealand National Provincial Championship.

He was named head coach of Ireland, on 13 October 1995, and held the office for a year, until resigning. In nine games, he won three and lost six.

Personal life

He married Heather Kidd, a journalist and author of a number of rugby biographies.

References

External links
Coaching Record - Murray Kidd IRE -vs- ALL (01/11/1995 to 04/01/1997) Pick and Go

1954 births
Living people
New Zealand rugby union coaches
Ireland national rugby union team coaches
Sportspeople from Te Kūiti